María Elena ‘Mariela’ Pérez Branger (born February 14, 1946 in Caracas, Venezuela) is a pageant titleholder. She is the Miss Venezuela titleholder for 1967, and was the official representative of Venezuela to the Miss Universe 1967 pageant held in Miami Beach, Florida, United States, on July 15, 1967, when she won the title of 1st Runner-up. The judges gave preference to American Sylvia Hitchcock.

In December 1970 Mariela Perez married a Dominican businessman Jose María Vicini Cabral. In 1978, their first-son  was born José Leopoldo. And five years later he had a brother, Marco Antonio. The family moved to Santo Domingo but  Mariela sometimes comes home, where still is the queen of Caracas society.

She was and remains an icon of beauty and style both in Venezuela and abroad. In 2001, Mariela Perez was in the jury of the contest Miss Venezuela 2001.

References

External links
"En el Tiempo de Mariela"
Miss Venezuela Official Website
Miss Universe Official Website

1946 births
Living people
Miss Universe 1967 contestants
Miss Venezuela winners
People from Caracas
Venezuelan expatriates in the Dominican Republic
Naturalized citizens of the Dominican Republic